Funtown Splashtown USA (commonly referred to as just "Funtown") is a family-owned amusement park located in Saco, Maine, in the United States.

History
In 1960, Ken (October 8, 1932 - January 8, 2013) and Violet Cormier opened Marvel Drive-In, a drive-in restaurant. Ken’s brother-in-law, Andre Dallaire opened a mini-golf course that previous year next to Marvel Drive-In. In 1963, Andre opened a go-kart track behind his mini golf course, and in 1964 Ken added batting cages and an archery range in 1967 behind Marvel Drive In. Over the course of the next few years, Cormier and Dallaire added several kiddie and carnival-style rides including SkySlides and Swinging Gyms. A gift shop was also opened.

In 1967, Cormier and Dallaire formed a partnership and Funtown U.S.A. was born. Over the next few years, Funtown added a Zipper, outdoor bumper cars, and a Bayern Kurve named “Luv Machine”.

In 1996, Cormier bought out the remaining Dallaire interest at the park and renamed it to Funtown Splashtown U.S.A. with the addition of the waterpark.

Featured attractions
The park features Northern New England’s tallest and longest wooden roller coaster, Excalibur, as well as New England's longest and tallest log flume, Thunder Falls. It also has a  Drop Tower called Dragon's Descent.

One of the park's most popular rides is the Astrosphere, which is an indoor Scrambler which features a state-of-the-art laser and light show while playing ELO's "Fire on High."

The Splashtown segment features Pirate's Paradise, a large interactive waterpark playground which dumps hundreds of gallons of water onto its guests every few minutes. For the 2007 season, an expansion was built that doubled the size of the waterpark and added two new thrill slides, Tornado and Mammoth. An additional expansion in 2012 added another 6 thrill slides to Splashtown.

Current attractions

Funtown USA Rides

Splashtown USA Water Slides and Pools

Former Attractions

See also
List of amusement parks in New England
Amusement ride
Palace Playland

References

External links
 Funtown Splashtown USA web site

Amusement parks in Maine
1960 establishments in Maine
Buildings and structures in Saco, Maine
Tourist attractions in York County, Maine
Amusement parks opened in 1960